Christine Sioui-Wawanoloath (born 1952) is a First Nations writer and artist living in Quebec, Canada.

The daughter of Augustin Sioui, Wendat, and Esther Wawanolett, Abenaki, she was born in Wendake. After the death of her father while she was still an infant, the remainder of the family moved to Odanak. She worked as darkroom technician, photographer, graphic artist and journalist for First Nations publications in Ottawa, Frobisher Bay and Val-d'Or. In 1985, she became program director for the Centre d'amitié autochtone in Val-d'Or. From 1992 to 2002, she was director of the non-violence program for Femmes autochtones du Québec. She then became a communications specialist for Terres en vues/Land InSights. Sioui-Wawanoloath is a painter, illustrator and the author of three plays, two of which have already been staged: Femme et esprit and Femme, homme et esprits. She also creates sculptures and writes poetry and stories.

Her son Alexis served in the Quebec national assembly. Her sister Monique was a native rights activist.

Selected works 
 La légende des oiseaux qui ne savaient plus voler (1995)
 Toloti (2003)
 Natanis (2005)

References 

1952 births
Living people
Wyandot people
Abenaki people
First Nations dramatists and playwrights
First Nations journalists
First Nations artists
First Nations poets
Canadian illustrators
First Nations women writers
Canadian women dramatists and playwrights
20th-century Canadian dramatists and playwrights
21st-century Canadian dramatists and playwrights
20th-century First Nations writers
21st-century First Nations writers
Canadian women non-fiction writers
21st-century Canadian women writers
20th-century Canadian women writers